Losindole (BI-27,062) is an antidepressant with a tricyclic structure. It was never marketed.

See also 
 Molindone
 Piquindone

References 

Tricyclic antidepressants
Pyrrolidines
Chloroarenes
Abandoned drugs